Lieutenant General Sir Robin Macdonald Carnegie  (22 June 1926 – 1 January 2011) was a senior British Army officer who became Military Secretary.  He died peacefully in Salisbury Hospice.

Military career
Educated at Rugby School, Carnegie was commissioned into the 7th Hussars in 1946. He was made Commanding Officer of the Queen's Own Hussars in 1967. He went on to be Commander of 11th Armoured Brigade in 1971 and General Officer Commanding 3rd Division in 1974. He became Chief of Staff at Headquarters British Army of the Rhine in 1976 and Military Secretary in 1978. He went on to be Director-General of Army Training in 1981.

He was also Colonel of the Queen's Own Hussars between 1981 and 1987.

Family
In 1955 Carnegie married Iona, daughter of John Sinclair. They had one son and two daughters and five grandchildren. Lady Carnegie died in 2015.

References

|-
 

1926 births
2011 deaths
People educated at Rugby School
British Army lieutenant generals
Knights Commander of the Order of the Bath
Officers of the Order of the British Empire
7th Queen's Own Hussars officers
Deputy Lieutenants of Wiltshire